Willys-Knight is an automobile that was produced between 1914 and 1933 by the Willys-Overland Company of Toledo, Ohio.

John North Willys purchased the Edwards Motor Car Company of Long Island, New York, in 1913, moving the operation to Elyria, Ohio, where Willys owned the plant that had previously manufactured the Garford automobile. Production began with a four-cylinder model which was priced in the $2,500 price range. The Willys-Knight employed a Knight sleeve valve engine, generally four- and six-cylinder models.

In 1915, Willys moved assembly of the Willys-Knight to Toledo, Ohio, but continued manufacturing the engines in Elyria. Willys-Knight introduced a sleeve-valve V8 in 1917, which was sold until 1919.

Willys-Knight enjoyed a production run average of 50,000 cars per year after 1922. Willys also purchased Stearns-Knight of Cleveland, Ohio, which also used a sleeve valve Knight Engine, making that marque the crown jewel in his growing automotive empire.

Willys-Knight production ended in November 1932 (model year 1933) when the company, in receivership, stopped building higher priced cars, and instead focused on the manufacture of the inexpensive but durable Willys 77.

Seven Willys-Knight vehicles including two large trucks and a touring car were used on the Martin and Osa Johnson photographic safari in the remotest areas of Africa.

See also
List of defunct automobile manufacturers of the United States

Models

References

Chrysler
Defunct motor vehicle manufacturers of the United States
Cars powered by Knight engines
Motor vehicle manufacturers based in Ohio
Defunct manufacturing companies based in Ohio
Willys-Knight